Fade to Red: Tori Amos Video Collection is a  double DVD set from recording artist and musician Tori Amos and was released by Rhino Entertainment on February 14, 2006. It featured music videos spanning 1992 to 2005, including the singles "Silent All These Years," "Crucify," "Cornflake Girl," and "A Sorta Fairytale", which co-stars Oscar winner Adrien Brody. The DVD features digitally re-mastered 5.1 audio and included a comprehensive audio commentary by Amos herself on each video. The collection omits the following music videos: "Glory of the 80's," "Strange Little Girl," and "Mary (Tales Version)."

Track listing
Disc 1
 "Past the Mission"
 "Crucify"
 "Jackie's Strength"
 "A Sorta Fairytale"
 "Winter"
 "Spark"
 "Sleeps with Butterflies"
 "Cornflake Girl" (US Version)
 "Hey Jupiter"
 "Silent All These Years"

Disc 2
 "Caught a Lite Sneeze"
 "1000 Oceans"
 "God"
 "Bliss"
 "China"
 "Raspberry Swirl"
 "Talula"
 "Sweet the Sting"
 "Pretty Good Year"

Bonus Videos
 "Professional Widow" (Remix)
 "Cornflake Girl" (UK Version) 
 Behind the Scenes: "A Sorta Fairytale"

Tori Amos video albums
2006 video albums
Live video albums
2006 live albums